is a Japanese actress, voice actress and narrator who works for Aoni Production.  She was previously affiliated with theater groups/production companies 劇舎燐, 俳協, Production Baobab and NABEYA.

She is most known for the roles of Kaori Makimura (City Hunter), Toraoh (Mashin Eiyuuden Wataru), Ryuunosuke Natsume (All Purpose Cultural Cat Girl Nuku Nuku), and Leni Milchstrasse (Sakura Wars).  Kazue Ikura has even taken her voice acting skills on stage to perform, in costume, Leni Milchstrasse during several events starting in 1998 to the present.

Filmography

Television animation 
 City Hunter (1987) (Kaori Makimura)
 The Adventures of Peter Pan (1989) (Tootles)
 The Three-Eyed One (1990) (Sharaku Hosuke)
 Ranma ½ (1992) (Satori)
 Sailor Moon (1992) (Balm)
 Detective Conan (1998) (Kaori)
 All Purpose Cultural Cat Girl Nuku Nuku (1998) (Natsume Ryunosuke)
 Crayon Shin-chan (1999) (Ryuko Fukazume)
 Sakura Wars (2000) (Leni Milchstrasse)
 Detective Conan (2001) (Yuki Togawa)
 Kirby of the Stars (2002) (Broom King)
 Angel Heart (2005) (Kaori Makimura)
 One Piece (2004) (Jessica)
 One Piece (2006) (Tony Tony Chopper (substitute for Ikue Ōtani))
 Black Lagoon (2006) (Garcia)
 One Piece (2009) (Sentomaru)
 Naruto Shippuden (2012) (Mebuki Haruno)
 Cutie Honey Universe (2018) (Oct Panther)

Unknown date
 Captain Tsubasa (Teppei Kisugi, Yoshiko Fujisawa)
 Tanoshii Moomin Ikka (Toft)
 Hime-chan's Ribbon (Pokota)
 Slayers (Hellmaster Phibrizzo)
 Sorcerous Stabber Orphen (Vulcan)
 Soreike! Anpanman (Shiratama-san)
 Robin Hood no Dai Boken (Robin Hood/Robert Huntington)

OVA 
 Mobile Suit Gundam 0083: Stardust Memory (1991) (Mora Bascht)
 RG Veda (1991) (Ashura)
 Sukeban Deka (1991) (Saki Asamiya)
 All Purpose Cultural Cat Girl Nuku Nuku (1992) (Natsume Ryunosuke)
 Godzilland (1994/1996) (Mothra)
Unknown date
 Sakura Wars (Leni Milchstrasse)

Theatrical animation 
 Mobile Suit Gundam: Char's Counterattack (1988) (Rezin Schnyder)
 City Hunter the Movie: Shinjuku Private Eyes (2019) (Kaori Makimura)
City Hunter (2023) (Kaori Makimura)

Unknown date
 Doraemon: Nobita and the Galaxy Super-express (Conductor)
 Mobile Suit Gundam F91 (Bertuo Rodriguez)
 Mobile Suit Gundam 0083: The Last Blitz of Zeon (Mora Bascht)
 Naruto the Movie: Road to Ninja (Mebuki Haruno)
 One Piece: Giant Mecha Soldier of Karakuri Castle (Tony Tony Chopper)

Video games 
 Tengai Makyō II: Manjimaru (1992) (Manjimaru)
 Sakura Wars 2 (1998) (Leni Milchstrasse)
 Ape Escape (1999) (Hiroki)

Unknown date
 BS Fire Emblem: Akaneia Senki (Richard)
  (Narrator, Valley Women's Division High School Minister of Housewives, Chief Publisher's Wife, and Hideko)
 Shin Megami Tensei: Digital Devil Saga (Jinana)
 Super Robot Wars series (Rezin Schnyder)
 Tales of Eternia (Shizel)
 Tales of Vesperia (Shizel)
 League of Legends (Teemo)

Tokusatsu 
 Taiyo Sentai Sun Vulcan (1981) (Puppeteer) (Actor) (ep. 27)
 Kamen Rider Black RX (1989) (100 Eyed Baaa (ep. 41))
 Kyoryu Sentai Zyuranger (1992) (Monster Goda) (Ep. 39)
 Ultraman Tiga (1997) (Irudo)
 Moero!! Robocon (1999) (voice of Robocon)

Dubbing roles

Live-action
Die Hard with a Vengeance (1998 Fuji TV edition) (Raymond (Aldis Hodge))
Kit Kittredge: An American Girl (Miss Lucinda Bond (Joan Cusack))
L.A. Law (Grace Van Owen)
Nicky Larson et le Parfum de Cupidon (Skippy's wife (Audrey Lamy))
Painted Faces (Child Samo)

Animation
Chowder (Truffles)
Clifford the Big Red Dog (Cleo)
Garfield's Pet Force (Vetvix)
A Troll in Central Park (Gus)

References

External links 
 Official agency profile 
 

1959 births
Living people
Aoni Production voice actors
Japanese stage actresses
Japanese video game actresses
Japanese voice actresses
Production Baobab voice actors
Tokyo Actor's Consumer's Cooperative Society voice actors
Voice actresses from Nagano Prefecture
20th-century Japanese actresses
21st-century Japanese actresses